Orazio Sorbello (born 10 August 1959 in Italy) is an Italian retired footballer.

References

Italian footballers
Living people
Association football forwards
Association football midfielders
1984 births
Calcio Padova players
Catania S.S.D. players
Palermo F.C. players
Modena F.C. players
U.S. Avellino 1912 players
Delfino Pescara 1936 players